William Thum (December 21, 1861 – May 10, 1941) served as Mayor of Pasadena, California from 1911 to 1913.

Early life 
On December 21, 1861, Thum was born in Michigan. Thum's parents were William Thum (1824-1883) and Christina (nee Greiner) Thum (1825-1907).

Career 
Thum was a chemist. Thum was known for Tanglefoot, an adhesive fly-paper.

In 1911, Thum became mayor of Pasadena, California, until 1913.

During Thum's administration, Pasadena assumed control of the city's water system.

Personal life 
Thum's wife is Margaret Thum. They have two children. On May 10, 1941, Thum died in Pasadena, California. Thum is buried at Hollywood Forever Cemetery in Los Angeles, California.

References

External links
 
 Thum House at deasypennerpodley.com
 William Thum at findagrave.com

1861 births
1941 deaths
American chemists
California Republicans
Mayors of Pasadena, California
People from the San Gabriel Valley